"The Last Walt" is the 20th episode of the third season of the American sitcom Modern Family and the series' 68th episode overall. This episode originally aired on ABC on April 18, 2012. It was written by Dan O'Shannon, Paul Corrigan & Brad Walsh and directed by Michael Spiller.

Plot
Claire (Julie Bowen) and Phil (Ty Burrell) do not know how to tell Luke (Nolan Gould) that their elder neighbor Walt, who Luke became close friends with, died. When they finally do, Claire is worried about Luke because he does not show any emotional reaction to the news while Phil worries about Claire's reaction; every time she said that Walt died, she smiled. When Phil mentions that to her she changes the subject to Luke's reaction for which both get more worried when they see Luke stealing Walt's TV from his house.

Claire tries to talk to Luke using the TV as a way to get emotion from Luke over Walt's passing but she fails and she asks him to take it back. Whilst returning the television she sees Luke looking sadly across the lawn at his room and he somberly tells his mom that he would see the TV light on at the house and confirm that Walt was OK. Claire then lets him keep the TV and calls Phil to say Luke is doing just fine.

Haley (Sarah Hyland) wants to throw a party in Jay (Ed O'Neill) and Gloria's (Sofía Vergara) house without permission so she tells Gloria that a responsible relative will be the chaperone and to Claire that her "uncle" will be a chaperone. Claire believes she talks about Mitch (Jesse Tyler Ferguson) but she talks about Manny (Rico Rodriguez). Manny is aghast at the activities that Haley's friends are getting up to. When Gloria comes home, she is equally angry at Haley for throwing the party and Manny for not having any fun; she then punishes Haley by making her continue with the party as Manny sets out to have immature fun as his mom wanted.

Phil realizes that Walt never fixed his estrangement from his daughter and he decides that he does not want the same thing to happen with himself and Alex (Ariel Winter), so he sets out with her for some great stories to fill in the empty gallery of Phil-Alex moments. All his attempts to create something special (he even tries to get a woman in labor so they can help her deliver since no one else is around to do it) fail and when Alex asks him why he is acting so weird, he tells her that he just wants to create a special memory for her. Alex tells him she will always remember how her dad spent the entire day trying to create a memory for her. Before heading home, Phil carves his daughter’s initials on the moon signage of the diner they visit, just as the astronaut Eugene Cernan did for own his daughter on the actual moon.

Meanwhile, Cam's father Merle (Barry Corbin) visits and Mitch and Cam (Eric Stonestreet) invite Jay for dinner, as the two never really bonded. Jay tries to avoid the dinner pretending to be sick but Mitch forces him to come along and make an effort. At the same time, Cam is forced to tell his father to do the same with Jay, as he does not like him either. Over dinner, the two men clash, with Jay hating the fact that Merle treats Mitchell like the woman in the relationship. Jay and Merle eventually talk and realize that they both try and treat their son's partner as the woman in a relationship because it makes them feel better. They finally come together and agree that they just have to accept the fact that their sons are gay and happy together.

Production
This episode was written by Dan O'Shannon, Paul Corrigan and Brad Walsh, and directed by Michael Spiller. Along with the main cast, this episode featured Barry Corbin as Merle Tucker, Cameron's father.

Reception

Ratings 
The episode was watched by 10.21 million viewers with an adult 18-49 rating/share of 4.1/11, a slight decline from the previous episode, "Election Day".

Reviews 
This episode received mixed reviews.

Michael Adams from 411mania gave the episode 8/10 saying that the character of the week was Cam's father, Merle: "Character of the week goes to our guest star this week, Barry Corbin, who created the role of Merle Tucker. Merle is the complete opposite of Cam, which makes the character so much more enjoyable to watch. However, there is a part of the 2 men that is very similar; perhaps it’s their farming background? Who knows? Either way, Merle and his gruffness was a great addition to the show this week."

Jules of Two Cents TV gave a good review to the episode saying: "I really enjoyed Phil’s story of trying to have that special day with Alex. Claire smiling as a coping mechanism was strange, but if anyone were to have something strange like that, it would be Claire. And Mr. Corbin as Cam’s dad was great!"

Leigh Raines of TV Fanatic rated the episode with 3.5/5. She liked the moments of most characters, one being Manny's small but rather memorable role. She stated "Manny had a minor storyline but it happened to be my favorite of the night." One of the moments she didn't enjoy was with Merle Tucker, Cam's father. "'The Last Walt' was an episode with a couple of different storylines running, unfortunately the dinner with Cam's dad was probably my least favorite."

Christine N. Ziemba of Paste Magazine gave the episode 6.8/10. She praised the storyline between Jay and Cameron's father and hailed Mitchell's line regarding cities and farms as the best of the night, remarking that it "was the funniest line of the night—but unfortunately, it didn't have much competition in 'The Last Walt'."

Donna Bowman from The A.V. Club gave the episode a C+ rate saying that the episode was "overstuffed". "Too bad it has to elbow for room with so many other ideas and characters in far-flung storylines. Sometimes when you overstuff an episode, you end up with less than the sum of the parts. That’s a shame when some of the parts are really good, and others could have been, with more time and a bigger spotlight."

References

External links

"The Last Walt" at ABC.com

2012 American television episodes
Modern Family (season 3) episodes